Alor Gajah District is one of the three administrative districts in Malacca, Malaysia. It borders Tampin District, Rembau District and Port Dickson District (including exclave of Tanjung Tuan) in Negeri Sembilan to the north and borders Jasin District and Melaka Tengah District in the east and south respectively.

Administrative divisions

The district is divided into 31 mukims (sub-districts) and consists of 7 towns which are Alor Gajah, Masjid Tanah, Pulau Sebang, Lubuk China, Kuala Sungai Baru, Rambia and Durian Tunggal.

Demographics

Federal Parliament and State Assembly Seats 

List of Alor Gajah district representatives in the Federal Parliament (Dewan Rakyat) 

List of Alor Gajah district representatives in the State Legislative Assembly

Educational institutions
 Advanced Technology Training Centre (ADTEC), Taboh Naning
 Malaysian Maritime Academy (ALAM), Kuala Sungai Baru
 University College Agroscience Malaysia (UCAM), Ayer Pa'abas
 University College of Islam Melaka (KUIM), Kuala Sungai Baru
 University of Kuala Lumpur (UniKL) Taboh Naning Campus, Taboh Naning - Institute of Chemical and Bioengineering Technology
 Universiti Teknologi MARA (UiTM) Alor Gajah Campus, Lendu
 MARA College of High Skills, Masjid Tanah
 National Youth Institute of High Skills (IKTBN), Masjid Tanah
 Malacca Matriculation College, Londang, Masjid Tanah
 Poultry Institute of Technology (ITU) Masjid Tanah
 Masjid Tanah Community College, Masjid Tanah

Transport
 Pulau Sebang/Tampin railway station at Pulau Sebang

Tourist attractions
 A' Famosa Resort
 Alor Gajah British Graveyard
 Alor Gajah Square
 Cape Rachado Lighthouse
 Datuk Wira Poh Ah Tiam Machap Recreational Park
 Dol Said's Grave
 Gadek Hot Spring

See also
 Districts of Malaysia

References

Districts of Malacca